Bloodwynd is a fictional necromancer published by DC Comics. He first appears in Justice League America #61 (April 1992) and was created by Dan Jurgens.

Fictional character biography
Bloodwynd is the descendant of a group of African-American slaves owned by a brutal, sadistic planter named Jacob Whitney. These slaves performed an ancient ritual to create a mystical Blood Gem, with which they killed Whitney. The Blood Gem was passed down among the slaves' descendants. The Gem bestowed great physical powers on its wearer; unbeknownst to them, it also contained a microscopic world, where Jacob Whitney's spirit had become incarnate as the demon Rott. Over the years Rott grew stronger, as the Gem absorbed the dark side of each wearer's soul.

In recent times, Rott sucked Bloodwynd into the Gem and held him captive, while mind controlling the Martian Manhunter, compelling him to wear the Gem and impersonate Bloodwynd. Using Bloodwynd's identity, the Manhunter rejoined the Justice League, seeking a power source which would enable Rott to escape from his micro-world.  While the JLA fought Doomsday alongside Superman, Blue Beetle realized Bloodwynd's identity when his cryptic teammate was incapacitated by fire (to which the Martian Manhunter was especially vulnerable). Once the truth was exposed, the Justice League battled Rott and freed the real Bloodwynd. Later, Bloodwynd, along with Ice, witnessed as Superman and Doomsday dealt each other the killing blows.

Bloodwynd remained with the Justice League after they rescued him from imprisonment within the Gem. Later, he withheld information from the League about an offer of alliance from the mystical villain Dreamslayer. Bloodwynd did not join Dreamslayer. Sensing a strange kinship with him, however, he would not oppose him either.

During the Overmaster storyline, Bloodwynd was also strangely inactive, refusing to take action against what he perceived to be a natural course of events. These two incidents caused Bloodwynd to question his membership in the League. He voluntarily put himself on reserve status.

He later appeared in Showcase '94 #5 (May 1994), written by Ruben Diaz and illustrated by Max Douglas. In this story, Bloodwynd reveals more about the nature of his morality and powers, and punishes a drug dealer by forcing him to experience the pain of his victims.

In JLA #27 (March 1999), Bloodwynd officially joins an emergency expansion of the Justice League in order to battle a rampaging Amazo. The battle, which takes place in the Florida Everglades, goes badly as most of the JLA are defeated and their powers copied. Amazo loses his powers when Superman officially disbands the league.

Day of Judgment

He appeared during the Day of Judgement storyline and in JLA Black Baptism serving as a member of the Sentinels of Magic. In the latter storyline, he was badly injured by the Diablos, a group of Mafia-styled demons who wished to gain revenge for demons slain during the Day of Judgement.

He was seen in a cameo during a bar brawl in the Oblivion Bar in Superman/Batman.

Alternate versions
Bloodwynd is later seen assisting a group of other-dimensional heroes in repairing their space station. He then assists as part of a super-army in taking down multiple cosmic threats against the entire multiverse.

A different Bloodwynd is part of an Earth which is free of crime due to Superman's robots. Bloodwynd manages to break free of the ennui surrounding the heroes as he recalls his heroic past; he realizes there is more to life than letting the robots handle everything.

Powers and abilities
The Blood Gem on Bloodwynd's chest is the main source of his powers. It grants him the power of flight, optic blasts, superhuman strength and durability as well as other unspecified mystical powers. The limits of his power are unknown, but have been hinted to be vast. In an encounter with the energy draining villain Starbreaker, the villain is shocked by the amount of energy inside Bloodwynd, stating it exceeds even that of Superman. Bloodwynd is also an accomplished necromancer. He can summon the spirits of the dead, which give him life energy and increased power. He can sense where death has occurred and also force murderers to experience the pain of their victims similar to Ghost Rider's "Penance Stare".

In other media
Bloodwynd was mentioned in Batman and Harley Quinn.

References

External links
 DCU Guide: Bloodwynd
 DCU Guide: Bloodwynd chronology
 DCU Guide: Showcase 94 #5/3

African-American superheroes
DC Comics characters who use magic
DC Comics characters with superhuman strength
DC Comics superheroes
DC Comics male superheroes
Comics characters introduced in 1992
Fictional necromancers
Characters created by Dan Jurgens